Tritonoturris sottoae is a species of sea snail, a marine gastropod mollusk in the family Raphitomidae.

Description
The length of the shell varies between 7.5 mm and 13 mm.

Distribution
This marine species occurs off Mactan Island, Cebu, Philippines

References

 Stahlschmidt P., Poppe G.T. & Tagaro S.P. (2018). Descriptions of remarkable new turrid species from the Philippines. Visaya. 5(1): 5-64. page(s): 10, pl. 5 figs 1-5.

External links
 Worms Link

sottoae
Gastropods described in 2018